Helter Skelter is the second studio album by The D.O.C.; released on January 23, 1996. This album was an attempt at making a comeback following the car crash which severely damaged his vocal cords. The album was widely ignored, and has even been discredited by D.O.C himself. The name of the album is a reference to Charles Manson's idea of The Beatles' "Helter Skelter" prophesying the end of the world.

The title and concept behind this album were originally developed by Dr. Dre as a collaborative effort between him and Ice Cube, titled Heltah Skeltah. At that time however, The D.O.C. had become disillusioned with Death Row Records and Dre, having received no payment for his work ghostwriting at Death Row . So in late 1994, D.O.C. decided to leave Death Row and headed to Atlanta, Georgia. Taking lyrics he had already written for Heltah Skeltah, he recorded Helter Skelter, keeping the name to spite Dre. His lyrics were inspired by the writings of Milton William Cooper.

It was his last album recorded for Warner Music Group, the only major music company for which he worked, this time it was recorded for Giant Records imprint of Warner Bros. Records label.

Track listing
All tracks produced by Erotic D, except where noted.

Samples
"Return of Da Livin' Dead" - Contains a sample of "It's Funky Enough" by The D.O.C.
"From Ruthless 2 Death Row (Do We All Part)" - Contains a sample of "Children's Story" by Slick Rick and a sample of For The Love Of You by The Isley Brothers 
"Secret Plan" contains a sample of "Black Sabbath" by Black Sabbath
"4 My Doggz" - Contains a sample of "The Chronic (Intro)" by Dr. Dre and a sample of "It's Funky Enough" by The D.O.C.
"Bitchez"- Contains a sample of Body Heat by Quincy Jones
"Brand New Formula" - Contains a sample of Inner City Blues (Makes Me Wanna Holler) by Marvin Gaye

Singles

Chart positions

References

1996 albums
The D.O.C. albums
Giant Records (Warner) albums
Horrorcore albums
Gangsta rap albums by American artists